Tomopleura striata is an extinct species of sea snail, a marine gastropod mollusk in the family Borsoniidae.

Description

Distribution
This extinct marine species from the Upper Cenozoic was found in New Zealand;

References

 Maxwell, P.A. (2009). Cenozoic Mollusca. pp. 232–254 in Gordon, D.P. (ed.) New Zealand inventory of biodiversity. Volume one. Kingdom Animalia: Radiata, Lophotrochozoa, Deuterostomia. Canterbury University Press, Christchurch.

striata
Gastropods of New Zealand
Gastropods described in 1917